The Dangqu (Chinese: , p Dāngqū) or Dam Chu (Tibetan: , w 'Dam Chu, lit. "Marshy River") is a  river in Qinghai province in the People's Republic of China. It is the geographic headwater of the Yangtze River, although the nearby Ulan Moron is traditionally regarded as the source.

The Dangqu runs from its source in the Tanggula Mountains to its confluence with the Ulan Moron, where the Tongtian River is formed.

References

Rivers of Qinghai